"Fitzpleasure" is a song by British alternative indie pop quartet alt-J from their debut studio album.

Music video
A music video to accompany "Fitzpleasure" was released on YouTube on November 5, 2012, with a total length of three minutes and forty-one seconds. French director Emile Sornin created the music video to be all black and white clips. The clips show a rundown, large city filled with gangsters, an old man with a tongue for an eye, prosthetic limbs, an old man with two faces (one in front and the other in the back of the head), contorting gang-like dancers, and mobsters.

Remakes and TV airings
After seeing the band perform live, Jim James, lead vocalist, guitarist, and songwriter for My Morning Jacket said, "...It kind of gave me this good, foreboding feeling. It was like seeing one of the great bands very young." This encouraged James to remix the song, and his 'Apple C' remix was included on the deluxe edition of An Awesome Wave.

The song was used by American recording artist Miley Cyrus during her Bangerz Tour, in a bondage-themed video interlude titled Tongue Tied. This later inspired the band to sample a line from her song "4x4" on "Hunger of the Pine", the lead single from their second album This Is All Yours.

"Fitzpleasure" was aired as the theme song in episode six, season eight of the television series Weeds in 2012. In 2013, "Fitzpleasure" was aired in a Nokia Lumia 925 commercial in Europe and Lumia 928 commercial in the United States. The UK trailer for The Way, Way Back also featured "Fitzpleasure". It was also aired in episode one, season one of Broad City.

It was played in the opening scene of The Blacklist Season 5, Episode 4 (No. 44) "The Endling," where "Fitzpleasure" is the name of a great European race horse.

Charts

Certifications

References

External links
 

2012 singles
Alt-J songs
Experimental rock songs
2011 songs
Songs written by Thom Sonny Green